The 1998 Pop Cola 800s season was the ninth season of the franchise in the Philippine Basketball Association (PBA).

1998 PBA draft

Summary
After two years and six conferences of non-semifinal appearances, Pop Cola finally made it to the semifinal round in coach Norman Black's first full season with the RFM ballclub.  The 800s placed third in the All-Filipino Cup by winning their one-game battle with Sta.Lucia for third place.

NBA journeyman Sean Higgins was Pop Cola's import in the Commissioner's Cup, Higgins lasted eight games and was replaced by Marcus Liberty, who led the 800s to three straight wins and an outright semifinals berth. After the eliminations, Liberty went back to the States to settle a family problem. Sherell Ford, a legitimate NBA first round pick, plane in for the best-of-five semifinal series against the San Miguel Beermen and scored 42 points in Pop Cola's 97-106 loss in Game one. The Beermen easily won in Game two and Pop Cola coach Norman Black decided for the team to replaced Ford. Assistant coach Alfrancis Chua recommended Marcus Timmons, who played for him at Tanduay in the PBL, Timmons' efforts were not enough to hold back the Beermen in the 800s' 79-92 loss in Game three. After Timmons left for Australia, coach Norman Black was forced to play in their game against Formula Shell for third place, Black makes history by becoming the oldest import to play in the league at age 41, leading his team to an 84-80 win over Shell.

Pop Cola had a pair of Victor Page and Paul Graham as their import for the Centennial Cup. After three games, Page was replaced by the comebacking Tony Harris, who led the 800s to four wins in eight games he played before a fracture in his right hand cut short his stint and was replaced by David Booth in their second outing in the Governor's Cup. Pop Cola lost their last game to Purefoods, 95-104 in overtime and the 800s missed out a semifinals berth, finishing one game behind the four semifinalist with eight wins and seven losses.

Notable dates
February 10: Pop Cola pick up their first win of the season after two losses to San Miguel and Alaska by winning over Formula Shell, 88-74. 

March 21: Pop Cola smothered a weary Sta.Lucia five, 78-70, for its second straight win in the All-Filipino Cup semifinals. The 800s improved their won-loss record to 7-6.

Roster

Transactions

Recruited imports

References

Pop Cola
Pop Cola Panthers seasons